is a railway station on the Fujikyuko Line in the town of Fujikawaguchiko, Yamanashi, Japan, operated by Fuji Kyuko (Fujikyu).

Lines

Station layout

The station is staffed and consists of one side platform serving a single bidirectional track. It has a waiting room but no toilet facilities. The station is staffed.

Adjacent stations

History
It was renamed Fujikyu-Highland Station on 11 January 1981.

Passenger statistics
In fiscal 2015, the station was used by an average of 1135 passengers daily.

Surrounding area
 Fuji-Q Highland theme park
 Fujikawaguchiko High School
 Yoshida-nishi Elementary School
 Chūō Expressway

References

External links

 Fujikyuko station information 

Railway stations in Yamanashi Prefecture
Railway stations in Japan opened in 1961
Stations of Fuji Kyuko
Fujikawaguchiko, Yamanashi